Retiboletus vinaceipes is a species of bolete fungus in the family Boletaceae. Found in the Dominican Republic, it was described  as new to science in 2007.

References

External links

Boletaceae
Fungi described in 2007
Fungi of the Caribbean